Thyatira florina is a moth in the family Drepanidae. It was described by Max Gaede in 1930. It is found on Sulawesi and Buru.

References

Moths described in 1930
Thyatirinae